The following is a list of FCC-licensed radio stations in the U.S. state of Nebraska which can be sorted by their call signs, frequencies, cities of license, licensees, and programming formats.

List of radio stations

Defunct
 KFKX

References

 
Nebraska
Radio stations